Colin McRae Rally 2005 is a racing video game developed and published by Codemasters.

Gameplay
As with previous games in the series, Colin McRae Rally 2005 is presented as a realistic rally simulation, with players participating in rallies consisting of 70 stages spread over nine countries. There are over 30 cars available. There is also a revised graphics and damage engine that enables paint scratches on the car, and a new 'career' mode where the player starts out in the lower club leagues and works their way up to compete with Colin McRae in his 2004 Dakar Rally Nissan Pick-Up. In 'Championship' mode the player takes the role of Colin himself competing in six rallies using any 4WD car. The game's graphic engine allows for more realistic damage effects, like broken glass and doors falling off, and a blurred vision effect if the player comes into contact with a hard object. The damage system has similarities to the Destruction Derby one, as a damaged radiator will stall the car, and make it need to restart the engine. A slight level of customization is the ability to put your name and nationality on the window.

A Mac OS X version of this game, renamed as Colin McRae Rally Mac, was published by Feral Interactive and developed by Robosoft Technologies, marking the first game in the series for the Mac OS X (now macOS). It was released on 26 October 2007, just six weeks after McRae's death in a helicopter crash. The development of the game was fraught with problems. Apple's switch to Intel Macs, some behind-the-scenes changes at Feral and other issues conspired to keep Colin McRae Rally Mac from being released until fairly late into 2007, despite it being based on PC-game underpinnings that Windows gamers had been enjoying since late 2004. Feral chose to make this release as independent of the PC franchise as possible to avoid any issues that might date it, calling it "Colin McRae Rally Mac" rather than attaching a year to it. Two mobile game versions of this game were created, a N-Gage title developed by Ideaworks3D and a J2ME title developed by IOMO and published by Digital Bridges. The N-Gage version reused stages from Colin McRae Rally 2.0. Both were nominated for BAFTAs in the Mobile and Handheld categories respectively. The PlayStation Portable version was ported to Japan under the name  and published by Interchannel-Holon on 14 June 2007.

Reception

Colin McRae Rally 2005 received "favourable" reviews on all platforms except the PSP version, which received "average" reviews, according to the review aggregation website Metacritic. GameSpot named Colin McRae Rally 2005 the best N-Gage game of 2004. It received a runner-up position in the publication's annual "Best Driving Game" award category across all platforms, losing to Burnout 3: Takedown.

References

External links
 
 
 
 

2004 video games
Codemasters games
Colin McRae Rally and Dirt series
Mobile games
N-Gage games
MacOS games
PlayStation 2 games
PlayStation Portable games
Racing simulators
Rally racing video games
Split-screen multiplayer games
Windows games
Xbox games
Video games set in Sweden
Video games set in Japan
Video games set in Finland
Sports video games set in Germany
Video games set in Spain
Video games set in Australia
Video games set in Greece
Video games set in the United Kingdom
Racing video games set in the United States
J2ME games
BAFTA winners (video games)
Video games developed in the United Kingdom
Feral Interactive games
Multiplayer and single-player video games
I-play games